Richard Lowell Rubenstein (January 8, 1924 – May 16, 2021) was a theologian, educator, and writer, noted particularly for his path-breaking contributions to post-Holocaust theology and his socio-political analyses of surplus populations and bureaucracy. A Connecticut resident, he was married to art historian Betty Rogers Rubenstein (deceased 2013).

Education 
Rubenstein began his tertiary education at Hebrew Union College, an institution within the Reform Judaism tradition. He graduated from the University of Cincinnati with a B.A. degree. He then was awarded the Master of Hebrew Literature from the Jewish Theological Seminary of America (Conservative tradition) and was also ordained as a rabbi by that institution. He then studied at Harvard Divinity School and was awarded a Master of Sacred Theology degree. Finally, he pursued doctoral studies and received a Ph.D. from Harvard University, in 1960.

Rubenstein was awarded two honorary doctorates: Doctor of Hebrew Letters, from Jewish Theological Seminary; and Doctor of Humane Letters, from Grand Valley State University.

Career 
Following his ordination in 1952, Rubenstein was the rabbi of two Massachusetts congregations in succession, and then in 1956 became assistant director of the B'nai B'rith Hillel Foundation and chaplain to the Jewish students at Harvard University, Radcliffe and Wellesley, where he served until 1958. From 1958 to 1970 he was the director of the B'nai B'rith Hillel Foundation and chaplain to the Jewish students at the University of Pittsburgh, Carnegie-Mellon University and Duquesne University.  At the University of Pittsburgh he also taught an upper division course on French Existentialism.  Rubenstein taught in religious studies at Florida State University from 1970 to 1995 and held the professorial chair. He then became president and professor of Religion at the University of Bridgeport, where he served from 1995 to 1999.

Rubenstein was also a newspaper columnist for a Japanese newspaper and wrote many books concerned with the Holocaust, theology, Jewish-Christian relations, ethics, and politics.

The Holocaust and death of God 
Rubenstein emerged in the 1960s as a significant writer on the meaning and impact of the Holocaust for Judaism. His first book, After Auschwitz, explored radical theological frontiers in Jewish thought.  Rubenstein argued that the experience of the Holocaust shattered the traditional Judaic concept of God, especially as the God of the covenant with Abraham, in which the God of Israel is the God of history. Rubenstein argued that Jews could no longer advocate the notion of an omnipotent God at work in history or espouse the election of Israel as the chosen people. In the wake of the Holocaust, he believed that Jews have lost hope and there is no ultimate meaning to life.

[A]s children of the Earth, we are undeceived concerning our destiny. We have lost all hope, consolation and illusion.

In After Auschwitz, Rubenstein argued that the covenant had died. He did not mean he was now an atheist, nor that religion had to be discarded as irrelevant. However, he believed not in a transcendent God, but in God as the ground of being:

Terms like "ground" and "source" stand in contrast to the terms used for the transcendent biblical God of history who is known as a supreme king, a father, a creator, a judge, a maker. When he creates the world, he does so as do males, producing something external to himself. He remains essentially outside of and judges the creative processes he has initiated. As ground and source, God creates as does a mother, in and through her own very substance. As ground of being, God participates in all the joys and sorrows of the drama of creation which is, at the same time, the deepest expression of the divine life. God's unchanging unitary life and that of the cosmos' ever-changing, dynamic multiplicity ultimately reflect a single unitary reality.

Rubenstein explored what the nature and form of religious existence could possibly comprise after Auschwitz (i.e., after the experience of the Holocaust). He suggested that perhaps the way forward was to choose some form of paganism.

When his work was released in 1966, it appeared at a time when a "death of God" movement was emerging in radical theological discussions among Protestant theologians such as Gabriel Vahanian, Paul Van Buren, William Hamilton, and Thomas J. J. Altizer. Among those Protestants, the discussions centred on modern secular unbelief, the collapse of the belief in any transcendent order to the universe, and their implications for Christianity. Theologians such as Altizer felt at the time that "as 'Death of God' theologians we have now been joined by a distinguished Jewish theologian, Dr Richard Rubenstein."

During the 1960s, the "Death of God" movement achieved considerable notoriety and was featured as the cover story of the April 8, 1966, edition of Time magazine. However, as a movement of thought among theologians in Protestant circles, it had dissipated from its novelty by the turn of the 1970s.

Unification Church
Rubenstein was a defender of the Unification Church and served on its advisory council, as well as on the board of directors of the church-owned Washington Times newspaper. In the 1990s, he served as president of the University of Bridgeport, which was then affiliated with the church.  Rubenstein said about the church's founder Sun Myung Moon:

I especially appreciated Rev. Moon's commitment to the fight against Communism. From his own first-hand, personal experience and out of his religious convictions, he understood how tragic a political and social blight that movement had been. I had been in East and West Berlin the week the Berlin Wall was erected in August 1961 and had visited communist Poland in 1965. Unfortunately, many of my liberal academic colleagues did not understand the full nature of the threat as did Rev. Moon. I was impressed with the sophistication of Rev. Moon's anti-communism. He understood communism's evil, but he also stood ready to meet with communist leaders such as Mikhail Gorbachev and Kim Il Sung in the hope of changing or moderating their views.

Other writings 
Rubenstein undertook a psychoanalytic study of Paul the Apostle in his book My Brother Paul. He continued with Holocaust themes in later writings and adjusted some of his earlier views about God in light of the Kabbalah.

Works

Autobiography

Books

Assessments 
 Zachary Braiterman, " "Hitler's Accomplice"?: The Tragic Theology of Richard Rubenstein," Modern Judaism, 17/1 (February 1997), pp. 75–89.
 Zachary Braiterman, (God) After Auschwitz (Princeton: Princeton University Press, 1999).
 Jakob Jocz, The Jewish People and Jesus Christ After Auschwitz (Grand Rapids: Baker, 1981).
 Michael Morgan, Beyond Auschwitz: Post-Holocaust Thought in America (New York: Oxford University Press, 2001).
 Betty Rogers Rubenstein and Michael Berenbaum, eds., What Kind of God? Essays in Honor of Richard L. Rubenstein (Lanham: University Press of America, 1995).

See also
 God is dead
 Holocaust theology
 Unification Church

References

External links 
 Richard L. Rubenstein Papers at the American Jewish Archives (includes a biographical sketch)
 Short biography

1924 births
2021 deaths
American Reform rabbis
Jewish American writers
20th-century American rabbis
American Jewish theologians
Religious naturalists
Philosophers of Judaism
Hebrew Union College – Jewish Institute of Religion alumni
Jewish Theological Seminary of America semikhah recipients
Harvard Divinity School alumni
University of Bridgeport faculty
Unification Church and Judaism
Unification Church controversies
Holocaust theology
Death of God theologians
The Washington Times people
Jewish anti-communists
American autobiographers
Rabbis from New York City